Helmut Lorenz (born 2 February 1969) is a retired Austrian football defender.

References

1969 births
Living people
Austrian footballers
WSG Tirol players
FC Wacker Innsbruck players
LASK players
SC Austria Lustenau players
Association football defenders
Austrian Football Bundesliga players
People from Innsbruck-Land District
Footballers from Tyrol (state)